This article contains lists of achievements in major senior-level international indoor handball, beach handball and field handball tournaments according to first-place, second-place and third-place results obtained by teams representing different nations. The objective is not to create combined medal tables; the focus is on listing the best positions achieved by teams in major international tournaments, ranking the nations according to the most podiums accomplished by teams of these nations.

Results
For the making of these lists, results from following major international tournaments were consulted:

 IHF: International Handball Federation
 IAHF: International Amateur Handball Federation
 IOC: International Olympic Committee
 IWGA: International World Games Association

Medals for the demonstration events are NOT counted. Medals earned by athletes from defunct National Olympic Committees (NOCs) or historical teams are NOT merged with the results achieved by their immediate successor states. The International Olympic Committee (IOC) do NOT combine medals of these nations or teams.

The tables are pre-sorted by total number of first-place results, second-place results and third-place results, then most first-place results, second-place results, respectively. When equal ranks are given, nations are listed in alphabetical order.

Indoor handball, beach handball and field handball

Men and women

*Defunct National Olympic Committees (NOCs) or historical teams are shown in italic.

Men

*Defunct National Olympic Committees (NOCs) or historical teams are shown in italic.

Women

*Defunct National Olympic Committees (NOCs) or historical teams are shown in italic.

Indoor handball

Men and women

*Defunct National Olympic Committees (NOCs) or historical teams are shown in italic.

Men

*Defunct National Olympic Committees (NOCs) or historical teams are shown in italic.

Women

*Defunct National Olympic Committees (NOCs) or historical teams are shown in italic.

Beach handball

Men and women

*Defunct National Olympic Committees (NOCs) or historical teams are shown in italic.

Men

*Defunct National Olympic Committees (NOCs) or historical teams are shown in italic.

Women

*Defunct National Olympic Committees (NOCs) or historical teams are shown in italic.

Field handball

*Defunct National Olympic Committees (NOCs) or historical teams are shown in italic.

See also
 Major achievements in Olympic team ball sports by nation
 List of major achievements in sports by nation

References

General
Official results
 Indoor handball
 Olympic tournament: History of the Olympic Games, Competitions Archive
 Men's World Championship: Competitions Archive - Indoor
 Women's World Championship: Competitions Archive - Indoor
 Beach handball
 Tournament at the World Games: World Games
 Men's World Championship: Competitions Archive
 Women's World Championship: Competitions Archive
 Field handball
 Olympic tournament: History of the Olympic Games, Competitions Archive
 Men's World Cup: Competitions Archive - Outdoor
 Women's World Cup: Competitions Archive - Outdoor

Specific

External links
 International Handball Federation (IHF) – official website

Handball
Achievements